The 1983 French Grand Prix was a Formula One motor race held at Paul Ricard on April 17, 1983.

French driver Alain Prost won the race for the Renault team, and this was the French marque's 3rd French Grand Prix win in a row and the 4th in 5 seasons. Second was the Brabham-BMW of  World Champion Nelson Piquet, with Prost's Renault teammate Eddie Cheever finishing third. Rounding out the points finishers were Patrick Tambay in his Ferrari, and the non-turbo Williamses of Keke Rosberg and Jacques Laffite. This was the final time that both Renault cars started on the front row until the 2003 Malaysian Grand Prix, when young Spaniard Fernando Alonso and Jarno Trulli started on the front row.

Summary

Qualifying
On home soil, Renault dominated the French Grand Prix. Alain Prost took pole position 2.3 seconds faster than second placed teammate Eddie Cheever. On the fast Circuit Paul Ricard with its 1.8 km long Mistral Straight, turbo engines had a large advantage. The fastest normally-aspirated car was the 12th placed McLaren-Ford of Long Beach runner up Niki Lauda, qualifying some 4.3 seconds slower than pole-sitter Prost. After occupying the front row of the grid at Long Beach, Ferrari had difficulty with René Arnoux qualifying 4th and Tambay qualifying 11th.

Failing to qualify for the race were the RAM-Fords of Eliseo Salazar and debutante Jean-Louis Schlesser and the Osella of Piercarlo Ghinzani.

Race
As he had done in qualifying, Prost dominated the race for his first win in over 12 months, only losing the lead during the mid-race pit stops. Piquet finished second in the Brabham-BMW while Eddie Cheever finished 3rd in his Renault. Tambay managed to salvage what had been a tough weekend by finishing 4th with the Williams pair of Rosberg and Laffite finishing a lap down in 5th and 6th respectively.

Before the race, Lotus driver Nigel Mansell had his toes accidentally run over by his own team pushing his car in the pits which caused him to need a pain killing injection. He started the race but retired after just 6 laps when the pain of pushing the pedals became unbearable. Long Beach winner John Watson was the races first retirement on lap 3 with engine failure in his McLaren.

Classification

Qualifying 

† — Time disallowed

Race

Championship standings after the race

Drivers' Championship standings

Constructors' Championship standings

Note: Only the top five positions are included for both sets of standings.

References

French Grand Prix
French Grand Prix
Grand Prix